Sphincter ani can refer to:
 Sphincter ani externus muscle
 Sphincter ani internus muscle